Leo Štulac (born 26 September 1994) is a Slovenian professional footballer who plays as a midfielder for Serie B club Palermo, on loan from Empoli. He represents the Slovenia national team.

Club career

Koper
Born in Koper, Štulac started his career at hometown club FC Koper. He made his Slovenian PrvaLiga debut on 2 April 2011, aged only 16 years and 6 months, in a 3–0 victory against Maribor.

In 2013, Štulac joined third division side Jadran Dekani on loan, where he scored four goals in 13 games.

With Koper, Štulac won the Slovenian Cup during the 2014–15 season and the Slovenian Supercup in 2015.

Venezia
On 15 July 2016, Štulac joined the Lega Pro side Venezia. In his first season, he gained promotion to Serie B. He also won the Coppa Italia Lega Pro with the club.

Štulac scored his first Serie B goal on 24 October 2017, in a 2–1 away defeat against Cittadella. On 5 May 2018, he scored the winner in a 2–1 victory against Foggia.

Parma 
On 30 June 2018, Štulac signed for Serie A club Parma on a five-year contract.

Empoli
On 26 July 2019, Štulac signed with Serie B club Empoli. With Empoli, he won promotion to Serie A in 2021, and played the 2021–22 Serie A with the Tuscanians.

Palermo
On 18 August 2022, Štulac was signed by Serie B club Palermo, on a loan deal with a conditional mandatory option to buy.

International career
Štulac played for various Slovenian national youth selections, such as the under-17, under-19 and under-21 teams.

In March 2018, he received his first call-up to the senior national team for the friendly matches against Austria and Belarus. He made his senior debut against Cyprus on 9 September 2018.

Honours
Koper
Slovenian Cup: 2014–15
Slovenian Supercup: 2015

Venezia
Lega Pro: 2016–17
Coppa Italia Lega Pro: 2016–17

Empoli
Serie B: 2020–21

References

External links
NZS profile 

1994 births
Living people
Sportspeople from Koper
Slovenian footballers
Association football midfielders
Slovenia international footballers
Slovenia youth international footballers
Slovenia under-21 international footballers
FC Koper players
Venezia F.C. players
Parma Calcio 1913 players
Empoli F.C. players
Palermo F.C. players
Slovenian PrvaLiga players
Serie C players
Serie B players
Serie A players
Slovenian expatriate footballers
Slovenian expatriate sportspeople in Italy
Expatriate footballers in Italy